The Littell-Lord Farmstead, located in Berkeley Heights, Union County, New Jersey, United States, is a pastoral site reminiscent of Union County's agricultural past. It was built around 1760 and added to the National Register of Historic Places on March 7, 1979. It currently serves as the home and public museum of the Berkeley Heights Historical Society.

The farmhouse was built around 1760 by farmer and weaver Andrew Littell, who lived there with his wife and seven children. It was passed down through the Littell family until it was sold to the Lord family in 1867. Elizabeth Wemett of the Lord family sold the property to Berkeley Heights in 1975.

The farmstead property, all of which is owned by the township of Berkeley Heights, includes the main farmhouse, an adjacent Victorian annex in the Carpenter Gothic style (which served as a schoolhouse in the 1870s), a stone spring house, a summer kitchen, and 18 acres of farm and forest land.

See also
National Register of Historic Places listings in Union County, New Jersey

References

Houses on the National Register of Historic Places in New Jersey
Houses in Union County, New Jersey
Houses completed in 1760
National Register of Historic Places in Union County, New Jersey
New Jersey Register of Historic Places
Berkeley Heights, New Jersey